Jim McNulty (born 1931) is a Canadian former professional ice hockey player.

Career 
McNulty played in the Eastern Hockey League (EHL) for 13 years from 1954 to 1967 and in playoffs twice, first, during the 1956 – 1957 season and, later, during the 1959–1960 season. McNulty played his first season with the Baltimore Clippers, four subsequent seasons with the Charlotte Clippers and, thereafter, with the Charlotte Checkers.

In 2008, McNulty was honoured when he was selected as inaugural inductee into the Charlotte Hockey Hall of Fame.

References

External links

Charlotte Checkers (EHL) players
Ice hockey people from Ontario
Living people
Sportspeople from St. Catharines
Year of birth missing (living people)
Canadian ice hockey centres
1931 births
Canadian ice hockey centre, 1930s births stubs